The 733d Air Mobility Squadron (733 AMS) is an air mobility squadron of the United States Air Force based at Kadena Air Base in Japan. It is part of the 515th Air Mobility Operations Group, based at Yokota Air Base, Japan and the 515th Air Mobility Operations Wing, based at Hickam Air Force Base, Hawaii.Originally constituted as the 603d Military Airlift Support Squadron (MASS) and activated on 27 Dec 1965, then organized and manned at Kadena Air Base on the Japanese Island of Okinawa. In January 1986 the 603d MASS was inactivated and consolidated with 603d Military Airlift Support Group (MASG). The unit continued to function as a Group until July 1994, but in 1992 was redesignated the 603d Airlift Support Group. With the establishment of Air Mobility Command the unit returned to its Squadron designation in July 1994 as the 633d Air Mobility Support Squadron (AMSS), and in March 2001 redesignated 733d Air Mobility Squadron (AMS).

References

 Unit information

Squadrons of the United States Air Force